Games '74 is a 1974 New Zealand–made documentary film of the 1974 British Commonwealth Games, held in Christchurch, New Zealand from 24 January to 2 February 1974. The full title was Games '74: Official Film of the Xth British Commonwealth Games, Christchurch, New Zealand, 1974.

The feature-length documentary in colour and on 35 mm was shot and processed by the New Zealand National Film Unit (NFU). The directors became prominent in New Zealand film-making in the next two decades, and one of the location assistants, one Sam Neill, went on to an international career.

The spectator's-eye camera avoids camera comment. The prime targets are track events, then field events, with “elephantine drama” from the male weightlifters and shots of the marathon which go outside the stadium. There is a surprisingly (for the time) gender-balanced and apolitical narrative which underlines the humanity of the competitors as much as it shows the drama of success and failure” according to Sam Edwards, although “woman’s events receive scant coverage”. Divers are captured in slow motion, and a “series of high jumpers, using similar techniques to cross the bar are edited in collapsed sequence, reminding viewers of salmon exploding up a waterfall”.

The film has been restored and is available on DVD.

References

New Zealand Film 1912-1996 by Helen Martin & Sam Edwards p58 (1997, Oxford University Press, Auckland)

External links
 
 Games '74 at NZ On Screen (full length video)

1974 films
New Zealand documentary films
1974 documentary films
Films set in the 1970s
Films shot in New Zealand
1974 British Commonwealth Games
1970s New Zealand films
1970s English-language films
National Film Unit